Corrado Farina (18 March 1939 – 11 July 2016) was an Italian film director, screenwriter, and novelist. He directed two feature films in the 1970s, many documentaries and commercials, and he published nine novels and an autobiography.

Filmography

Novels
  Un posto al buio, Biblioteca del Vascello, 1994.
  Giallo antico, Fògola, 1999.
  Storia di sesso e di fumetto, Mare nero, 2001.
  Dissolvenza incrociata, Fògola, 2002.
  Il calzolaio, Marco Valerio, 2004.
  Il cielo sopra Torino, Fògola, 2006.
  L'invasione degli ultragay - una storia politicamente scorretta, Zero91, 2008.
  La figlia dell'istante, Fògola, 2010.
  Vita segreta di Emilio Salgari, Daniela Piazza, 2015.

References

Footnotes

Sources

External links

1939 births
2016 deaths
Italian film directors
20th-century Italian novelists
20th-century Italian male writers
Giallo film directors